Hancockia  is a genus of sea snails, marine gastropod mollusks in the family Hancockiidae.

Species
 Hancockia burni Thompson, 1972
 Hancockia californica MacFarland, 1923
 Hancockia papillata (O'Donoghue, 1932)
 Hancockia ryrca Er. Marcus, 1957
 Hancockia schoeferti Schrödl, 1999
 Hancockia uncinata (Hesse, 1872)
Species brought into synonymy
 Hancockia eudactylota Gosse, 1877: synonym of Hancockia uncinata (Hesse, 1872)

References

 Gosse P. H., 1877: On Hancockia eudactylota, a genus and species of mollusks supposed to be new ; Annals and Magazine of Natural History (4) 20: 316-319
 Gofas, S.; Le Renard, J.; Bouchet, P. (2001). Mollusca. in: Costello, M.J. et al. (eds), European Register of Marine Species: a check-list of the marine species in Europe and a bibliography of guides to their identification. Patrimoines Naturels. 50: 180-213

Hancockiidae